Rampurdih also known as Dihrampur is a village in Darbhanga, Bihar state, in India. The village is divided into two Tola known Utharwari Tola and Dakhsinwari Tola. This Village comes under the Rampurdih Panchayat. The Mukhiya name of this panchayat is Mr. Lalan Mahto
And Vice Mukhiya Name is Smt.- Radha Devi. W/O-Manoj Thakur

See also
Panchobh

External links
 Know...More About Mithila
 Mithila Website
 Maithili Website

Villages in Darbhanga district